The British Consulate-General, San Francisco, is the United Kingdom's local consulate for Northern California, as well as Alaska, Idaho, Montana, Nevada (except Clark County (Las Vegas)), Oregon, Wyoming, and Washington State.  There is also a Consulate-General in Los Angeles.

List of Consuls-General of the United Kingdom to San Francisco 

1898–1901: Clayton Pickersgill 
1901–1907: Sir Courtenay Bennett 
1907–1911: Sir Walter Hearn 
1911–1921: Alexander Ross 
1922–1931: Sir Gerald Campbell 
1931–1938: Archibald Charlton 
1938–1941: Sir Paul Butler 
1941–1945: Sir Godfrey Fisher 
1945–1947: Sir Cyril Cane 
1947–1949: Sir William Meiklereid 
1949–1952: John Mitcheson 
1952–1954: Kenneth White 
1954–1957: Sir Robert Hadow 
1957–1960: Sir Herbert Marchant 
1960–1963: Randle Reid-Adam 
1963–1965: Lancelot Pyman 
1965–1967: Peter Dalton 
1967–1970: John Lloyd 
1970–1973: Sir James Murray 
1973–1977: Robert Farquharson 
1977–1982: Ian Kinnear 
1982–1986: John Beaven 
1987–1990: Sir Graham Burton 
1990–1994: Antony Ford 
1994–1998: Malcolm Dougal
1998–2001: Michael Frost 
2001–2003: Roger Thomas 
2003–2007: Martin Uden
2007–2011: Julian Evans
2011–2016: Priya Guha
2016–: Andrew Whittaker

References

External links 
British Consulate-General San Francisco

Consuls-General, San Francisco
San Francisco
United Kingdom
San Francisco-related lists